Robert Maximilian de Gaynesford (born 2 January 1968) is an English philosopher. He is a professor of philosophy at the University of Reading.

Education and career
De Gaynesford was educated at Ampleforth College and Balliol College, Oxford (1986–1989; First in Modern History), after which he spent several years studying theology before turning to philosophy in 1993. Shortly before receiving his doctorate, he was elected fellow and tutor in philosophy at Lincoln College, Oxford (1997). He was subsequently Humboldt Research Fellow at the Freie Universität Berlin (2003) and a tenured professor at The College of William and Mary in Virginia (2002–2006) before becoming professor of philosophy (2008) and head of department (2016) at the University of Reading.

He is the author of four books: The Rift in the Lute: Attuning Poetry and Philosophy (Oxford, 2017), I: The Meaning of the First Person Term (Oxford, 2006), Hilary Putnam (Routledge, 2006; the book's aim was "to make Putnam’s contributions to modern philosophy accessible to those without expertise in such matters"), and John McDowell (Polity, 2004). In 2011, he edited a collection of articles on the Philosophy of Action, Agents And Their Actions (Blackwell), including recent work by John McDowell and Joseph Raz. He spoke at the Harvard Conference in celebration of Hilary Putnam in 2011. He often gives papers on attuning poetry and philosophy for general audiences; in 2015, he gave a public talk at the Ashmolean Museum in Oxford on 'Why Philosophy and Poetry Matter.' In 2017, he took part in a short filmed conversation about Philosophy and Film with Lenny Abrahamson and Francine Stock. Their subsequent extended public discussion was recorded as a podcast.  He is also interested in moral psychology and the interface with the philosophy of law, where he unearths a particular type of defense that he calls 'justifexcuses.'

Selected bibliography

Books
The Rift in the Lute: Attuning Poetry and Philosophy
I: The Meaning of the First Person Term
Hilary Putnam
John McDowell

Chapters in books
The Sonnets and Attunement in The Routledge Companion to Shakespeare and Philosophy (Routledge, 2018) eds Craig Bourne and Emily Caddick Bourne.
Attuning philosophy and literary criticism: a response to In the Heart of the Country in Beyond the Ancient Quarrel: Literature, Philosophy, and J.M. Coetzee (Oxford, 2017) eds P. Hayes and J. Wilm.
Uptake In Action in Interpreting J.L. Austin: Critical Essays (Cambridge, 2017) ed. Savas Tsohatzidis.

References

External links
 Academia.
 OCLC.
 British Journal of Aesthetics review of The Rift In The Lute: Attuning Poetry and Philosophy (by Richard Eldridge; Volume 59, Issue 2, April 2019, Pages 236–239). 
 Commentary on recent books including The Rift In The Lute: Attuning Poetry and Philosophy (by Lowell Gallagher; "Recent Studies in the English Renaissance" SEL: Studies in English Literature 1500–1900, vol. 58 no. 1, 2018, pp. 219-277).
 TLS review of I: The Meaning of the First Person Term (by Stephen Williams; 20 April 2007).
 I: The Meaning of the First Person Term Chapter 1.
 The Seriousness of Poetry.
 Illocutionary Acts, Subordination and Silencing.

Living people
English Roman Catholics
Philosophers of language
Philosophers of mind
Fellows of Lincoln College, Oxford
People educated at Ampleforth College
1968 births
Academics of the University of Reading
Alumni of Balliol College, Oxford